Gaas is a commune in the Landes department in Nouvelle-Aquitaine in southwestern France. It consists of 496 residents as of 2017, with 237 residences. It has a population density of 54 people/km squared.

Population

References

See also
Communes of the Landes department

Communes of Landes (department)